Andy Wood,  (born 1967) is a British social historian and academic. 

Mostly, he works on the early modern period (1500–1800), but his work on folklore has taken him into the mid-twentieth century. His research interests include popular politics, rebellion, popular memory, belief, popular culture, local identity, folklore, migration patterns, urban and rural society, the mid-Tudor crisis, the English Revolution, popular understandings of Renaissance drama, class identities, and local traditions. With his friend John H. Arnold, he co-authored a critique of Ken MacLeod's science-fiction writing. He also has an interest in the history of the British Left in the late twentieth century. His fourth book, The Memory of the People: Custom and Popular Senses of the Past in Early Modern England, won the American Historical Association's Leo Gershoy Award.

Wood is currently writing two books: I Predict a Riot: a history of the World in Twelve Rebellions (Atlantic Books, forthcoming); Letters of Blood and Fire: Authority and Resistance in England, 1500-1640 (Cambridge University Press: forthcoming).

Wood holds degrees from the University of York and Cambridge University. He has held Fellowships at the Folger Shakespeare Library, the Huntington Library and the Institute of Historical Research. He is Professor of Social History at Durham University.

He is an elected Fellow of the Royal Historical Society (FRHistS). In 2022, he was elected a Fellow of the British Academy (FBA), the United Kingdom's national academy for the humanities and social sciences.

Books
 Faith, Hope and Charity: English Neighbourhoods, 1500-1640 (Cambridge University Press, 2020).

References

External links

Academics of Durham University
Alumni of the University of Cambridge
Alumni of the University of York
English historians
Fellows of the Royal Historical Society
1967 births
Living people
English Revolution
Fellows of the British Academy